Michael Maher may refer to:
Michael Maher (hurler) (1930–2017), Irish hurler
Michael Maher (Australian politician) (1936–2013), member of Parliament from 1982 to 1987
Michael Whalen Maher (1830–1905), architect, builder and politician in New Brunswick
Michael 'Moegie' Maher, mayor of County Galway, 2011–12
Mikey Maher (1870–1947), Irish hurler